Edward Lee Merkle (July 3, 1917 – November 27, 1987) was an American football guard in the National Football League for the Washington Redskins.  He played college football at Oklahoma State University.

1917 births
1987 deaths
People from Windsor, Missouri
American football offensive guards
Oklahoma State Cowboys football players
Washington Redskins players